The 1959 Oregon State Beavers football team represented Oregon State College as an independent during the 1959 NCAA University Division football season.  In their fifth season under head coach Tommy Prothro, the Beavers compiled a 3–7 record and were outscored 178 to 166. They played three home games on campus at Parker Stadium in Corvallis and one at Multnomah Stadium in Portland.

Earlier in the year, the Pacific Coast Conference (PCC) disbanded; this was the first of five years that Oregon State and Oregon competed as independents.

Schedule

References

Oregon State
Oregon State Beavers football seasons
Oregon State Beavers football